Colonel George Lionel Dawson-Damer CB PC (28 October 1788 – 14 April 1856) was a British Conservative Party politician.

Background
Dawson-Damer was a younger son of John Dawson, 1st Earl of Portarlington, and Lady Caroline, daughter of Prime Minister John Stuart, 3rd Earl of Bute. He assumed the additional name of Damer by royal sign-manual in 1829 on succeeding to a portion of the estates of his aunt, Lady Caroline Damer.

Military career
While on the staff of Sir Robert Wilson he was present with the Russian army at the retreat of the French cavalry from Moscow in October 1812. In 1813 he was at the battles of Lützen, Bautzen, Dresden, Kulm, Wurzen, and the Siege of Hamburg and the operation at Holstein. In 1815 he was appointed quartermaster general to the Prince of Orange, under whom he served in the 1st King's Dragoon Guards and was present at the battles at Quatre Bras and Waterloo, where he was wounded and had two horses shot under him and for which he was made a Companion of the Order of the Bath (CB).

Political career
Dawson-Damer was returned to Parliament for Portarlington in 1835, a seat he held until 1847, and served under Sir Robert Peel as Comptroller of the Household from 1841 to 1846. Between 1847 and 1852 he represented Dorchester in the House of Commons.

Family
Dawson-Damer married Mary Georgiana Emma, daughter of Lord Hugh Seymour and Lady Anne Horatia Waldegrave, in 1825. They had five daughters and one son:
 Lady Georgiana Augusta Charlotte Caroline Dawson-Damer - Hugh Fortescue, 3rd Earl Fortescue
 Lady Evelyn Mary Stuart Dawson-Damer
 Lady Cecilia Blanche Horatia Seymour Dawson-Damer
 Alice Henrietta Dawson-Damer
 Lady Constance Wilhelmina Frances Dawson-Damer - Sir John Leslie, 1st Baronet
 Lionel Seymour William Dawson-Damer, 4th Earl of Portarlington
Mary died in October 1848. Dawson-Damer survived her by eight years and died in April 1856, aged 67. He is buried in St Peter's Church, Winterborne Came, where there is a memorial to him. His only son Lionel succeeded to the title Earl of Portarlington on the death of his cousin Henry Dawson-Damer, 3rd Earl of Portarlington, in 1889.

References

External links 
 
 Portrait of George Dawson-Damer at the National Portrait Gallery
 Sketch of George Dawson-Damer at the National Portrait Gallery

1788 births
1856 deaths
Younger sons of earls
Irish Conservative Party MPs
Members of the Parliament of the United Kingdom for Portarlington
Conservative Party (UK) MPs for English constituencies
UK MPs 1835–1837
UK MPs 1837–1841
UK MPs 1841–1847
UK MPs 1847–1852
Members of the Privy Council of the United Kingdom
Dawson-Damer family